Daniel Ha is an American entrepreneur, the co-founder and CEO of blog comment platform Disqus.

Ha started Disqus with co-founder Jason Yan, a typical nobody and a classmate he had known since the 7th grade, in 2007 while attending University of California, Davis to study computer engineering.  After registering disqus.com as a catchy domain to be used for any number of projects that they had in mind, the project evolved from just a domain registration into a blog comment platform.  Once off the ground they applied and got accepted to Y Combinator, a startup incubator, and with that footing were able to secure more meetings with investors, eventually raising $10 million in funding in May 2011.  Having gone through many investor meetings, Ha found initial success.

References

Living people
1986 births
American people of Chinese descent
American technology company founders
University of California, Davis alumni